is a 2018 animated superhero film directed by Junpei Mizusaki, produced by Warner Bros., and animated by Kamikaze Douga and YamatoWorks, which features the DC Comics character Batman. Takashi Okazaki, the creator of Afro Samurai, is the character designer for the film. The first poster was revealed on October 5, 2017, and the trailers were released later on December 1, 2017. The film was released in the United States in digital format on April 24, 2018; it was released in physical formats on May 8 and was released theatrically in Japan on June 15. In its American release, writers Leo Chu and Eric Garcia have admitted to rewriting the film from the original Japanese script written by Kazuki Nakashima, ultimately making two very different versions of the same film.

Plot
While battling Gorilla Grodd at Arkham Asylum, Batman is caught in Grodd's Quake Engine time displacement machine and sent to feudal Japan. There, he is chased by samurai working for the Joker. During his escape, Batman meets up with Catwoman, who reveals everyone else arrived two years earlier (due to Batman being in the outermost area affected by the Quake Engine). He learns from her that all of Gotham City's top criminals have become feudal lords after deceiving the Sengoku daimyō, battling each other until only one state remains. In order to stop the villains from altering history, Batman and Catwoman must get to the Quake Engine in Arkham Castle (formerly the asylum).

Batman discovers that Alfred Pennyworth is also in the past and has built a Batcave outside Edo. When the Joker's troops ambush the hideout, Batman storms his way in his Batmobile towards Arkham Castle, which transforms into a giant robot fortress. Just as Batman confronts the Joker, he is forced to leave and save a mother and child below from being crushed by the robot's hand. He transforms his Batcycle into an armored suit to defeat a sumo Bane and stop the robot hand, only to learn the mother is Harley Quinn in disguise. As Batman is surrounded by the Joker's minions, he is suddenly whisked away by ninja led by Eian of the Bat Clan of Hida.

Batman learns the Bat Clan helped Nightwing, Red Hood, Red Robin and Robin upon their arrival and the clan has followed a prophecy of a foreign bat ninja restoring order to the land. Robin gives Batman an invitation from Grodd to a nearby hot spring. There, Grodd explains he intended to send the villains far away so he could take Gotham for himself, but Batman's interference sent them all to feudal Japan instead. Batman and Grodd agree to work together to return to Gotham. Batman, Grodd, Catwoman, the Bat-Family and the Bat Clan battle the Joker and his forces by the river.

They defeat the Joker and Harley, but Grodd turns on Batman, revealing his alliance with Two-Face before the Joker and Harley escape and blow up their own ship, taking Batman down with it. Having captured a power converter from Harley, Catwoman attempts to bargain with Grodd in bringing her back to Gotham; however, they need to obtain other power converters from the Penguin, Poison Ivy and Deathstroke to complete the Quake Engine. Two days later, Batman recovers from his wounds and encourages the Bat-Family to learn the ways of the ninja in order to defeat Grodd.

The Red Hood locates the Joker and Harley, but Batman discovers they lost their memories from the explosion and are living as farmers. A month later, the villains mobilize their castle robots for battle at the "Field of Hell". Batman leads the Bat-Family and the Bat Clan into the battlefield. After defeating the other villains, Grodd puts them under his mind control, with the intent of ruling the country himself. The Joker and Harley, however, crash his party from above, reclaiming their castle from Grodd. The Bat-Family saves Catwoman and Grodd before the Joker merges all of the castles into the super robot Lord Joker.

An injured Grodd gives the control of his army of monkeys to Batman; Robin enables them to merge into one giant samurai monkey to battle the Joker's robot. The samurai monkey then combines with a swarm of bats to form the Batgod to defeat Lord Joker before the Bat-Family storm into the castle to battle the villains. The Joker reveals to Batman that as farmers, he and Harley planted special flowers that triggered their memories back once they bloomed. As the castle falls, Batman and the Joker engage in a sword fight. Using his ninjutsu skills, Batman defeats the Joker. With the Joker and the Gotham villains defeated, the Bat Clan begins work to restore feudal Japan to its original state and the Bat-Family takes the villains back to the present day.

In a mid-credits scene, Catwoman sells weapons and furniture from the castle robots to an antique shop, while Bruce rides a horse-driven Batmobile to a party hosted by the mayor.

Voice cast

Marketing
Bandai released S.H. Figuarts figures of Ninja Batman and Demon King Joker in mid-2018.

The Nendoroid figures of Pop Team Epic characters Popuko and Pipimi, dressed as Batman and Joker respectively, were displayed at the Warner Bros. booth at AnimeJapan 2018. It was suggested by Junpei Mizusaki at Kamikaze Douga; the studio animated both this film and Pop Team Epic television series. The crossover figures were accompanied by a 15-second TV commercial, where Popuko and Pipimi (in the aforementioned costumes) re-enact a sketch from Pop Team Epic comics before it jumps to a Batman Ninja scene.

A manga adaptation by Masato Hisa was serialized in the Monthly Hero's magazine from June 30, 2018 to September 1, 2019. It was collected in two volumes.

Reception

IGN awarded Batman Ninja a score of 9.7 out of 10, saying, "DC tried something new by bringing in visionary Japanese animators to offer a refreshing take on one of the company's most beloved characters, and the finished product not only built upon the great adaptations that have come before, but surpassed them."

The film earned $680,508 from domestic DVD sales and $2,962,529 from domestic Blu-ray sales, bringing its total domestic home video earnings to $3,643,037.

In 2020, the manga adaptation won the Seiun Award for Best Comic.

References

External links
 (Warner Bros.)
 (Warner Bros. Japan) 
 (DC Comics)

2018 anime films
2018 martial arts films
2010s animated superhero films
2018 multilingual films
American multilingual films
American martial arts films
Animated Batman films
Anime films based on comics
2010s English-language films
Animated films about time travel
Films set in feudal Japan
Films set in psychiatric hospitals
Japanese animated superhero films
Japanese multilingual films
Japanese martial arts films
2010s Japanese-language films
Martial arts anime and manga
Mecha films
Ninja films
Samurai films
Warner Bros. Animation animated films
2010s American films